1cP-LSD (N1-(cyclopropylmethanoyl)-lysergic acid diethylamide) is an acylated derivative of lysergic acid diethylamide (LSD), which has been sold as a designer drug.
 In tests on mice it was found to be an active psychedelic with similar potency to 1P-LSD.

Legal status 

Sweden's public health agency suggested classifying 1cP-LSD as a dangerous substance on 18 December 2019 and later classified it as such on 22 April 2021.

See also 
 Lysergic acid diethylamide (LSD)
 1B-LSD
 1P-LSD
 1V-LSD
 ALD-52
 1cP-AL-LAD
 AL-LAD
 ETH-LAD
 1P-ETH-LAD
 PRO-LAD
 LSM-775
 LSZ
 O-Acetylpsilocin (4-AcO-DMT)

References 

Designer drugs
Lysergamides
Prodrugs
Serotonin receptor agonists